Leonard Strachan is an astrophysicist who works on instrumentation to study the Sun's corona and solar wind. He currently works at the United States Naval Research Laboratory where he is the principal investigator for the Ultraviolet Spectro-Coronagraph (UVSC) Pathfinder, and serves on the National Academy of Sciences Committee on Solar and Space Physics.

References 

Massachusetts Institute of Technology alumni
Harvard University alumni
African-American scientists
Year of birth missing (living people)
Living people
American astrophysicists
21st-century African-American people
African-American physicists